The 2016 Bucknell Bison football team represented Bucknell University in the 2016 NCAA Division I FCS football season. They were led by seventh-year head coach Joe Susan and played their home games at Christy Mathewson–Memorial Stadium. They were a member of the Patriot League. They finished the season 4–7, 3–3 in Patriot League play to finish in fourth place.

Schedule

Source: Schedule

Game summaries

at Marist

at Duquesne

Cornell

VMI

at Holy Cross

Colgate

Lafayette

at Charleston Southern

at Lehigh

at Georgetown

Fordham

References

Bucknell
Bucknell Bison football seasons
Bucknell Bison football